This is a list of former railway stations and railway lines in Victoria, Australia. Many of these stations and lines have been abandoned or demolished. There is a strong desire by communities to have many of these re-opened to better link Regional Victoria to the state capital Melbourne. Public transport has become increasingly popular in the 21st century for convenience and affordability reasons.  For closed railway stations in suburban Melbourne, see List of closed railway stations in Melbourne.

Mildura line

Originally withdrawn on 12 September 1993. Once served by The Vinelander service, the line branches from the Serviceton line at Ballarat.
Tourello
Dunolly
St Arnaud
Donald
Birchip
Ouyen
Red Cliffs
Irymple
Mildura

Leongatha line

The passenger service was withdrawn on 24 July 1993, but the Dandenong to Cranbourne section was later electrified and became part of the Melbourne suburban rail network in 1995.
Cranbourne East
Clyde
Tooradin
Koo Wee Rup
Lang Lang
Nyora
Loch
Korumburra
Leongatha

Closed lines

The following lines are either closed to regular passenger services, freight only, part of tourist and heritage railways, or closed and removed.

South Western:
Geelong-Ballarat railway line
Fyansford railway line
Cunningham Pier railway line
Queenscliff railway line (Bellarine Peninsula Railway)
Geelong Racecourse railway line
Wensleydale railway line
Forrest railway line
Newtown-Colac railway line
Crowes railway line
Alvie railway line
Timboon railway line
Mortlake railway line
Koroit-Hamilton railway line
Port Fairy railway line (open as far as Warrnambool)
Midland:
Geelong-Ballarat railway line (freight only)
Gheringhap-Maroona railway line (freight and The Overland only)
Mildura railway line (freight only)
Ballarat region:
Waubra railway line
Ballarat Cattle Yards railway line
Buninyong railway line
Skipton railway line
Newtown-Colac railway line
Ballarat – Serviceton:
Avoca railway line (freight only)
Navarre railway line
Carpolac railway line
Bolangum railway line
Patchewollock railway line (freight only to Hopetoun)
Yaapeet railway line (freight only)
Yanac railway line
Ballarat – Mildura:
Avoca railway line (freight only)
Castlemaine-Maryborough railway line (freight only to Moolort from Maryborough)
Pinnaroo railway line (freight only)
Millewa South railway line
Morkalla railway line
Ballarat to Daylesford railway line
Ararat – Portland:
Portland railway line (freight only)
Grampians railway line
Balmoral railway line
Koroit-Hamilton railway line
Coleraine railway line
Casterton railway line
Mount Gambier railway line (isolated by rail gauge)
Northern:
Melbourne – Bendigo:
Lancefield railway line
Daylesford railway line (Daylesford Spa Country Railway)
Castlemaine-Maryborough railway line
Maldon railway line (Victorian Goldfields Railway)
Redesdale railway line
Heathcote railway line
West from Bendigo:
Robinvale railway line (freight only)
Wedderburn railway line
Eaglehawk-Inglewood railway line
Kulwin railway line (freight only)
Stony Crossing railway line
Yungera railway line
Kerang-Koondrook Tramway
East from Bendigo:
Cohuna railway line
Toolamba-Echuca railway line (freight only)
Deniliquin railway line (freight only)
Balranald railway line (freight only to Moulamein in New South Wales)
North Eastern:
Melbourne – Wodonga:
Heathcote railway line
Mansfield railway line
Tatong railway line
Oaklands railway line, Victoria (freight only)
Whitfield railway line
Bright railway line
Yackandandah railway line
Peechelba East railway line
Wahgunyah railway line
Cudgewa railway line (freight only to Bandiana)
Goulburn Valley:
Rushworth railway line
Toolamba-Echuca railway line (freight only)
Katamatite railway line (freight only to Dookie)
Picola railway line
Cobram railway line
Tocumwal railway line (freight only beyond Shepparton)
Eastern:
Melbourne – Orbost:
Orbost railway line (open as far as Bairnsdale)
Noojee railway line
Walhalla railway line (Walhalla Goldfields Railway)
Thorpdale railway line
Yallourn railway line
Mirboo North railway line
Maryvale railway line
Maffra railway line
Briagolong railway line
Sale Wharf railway line
Bairnsdale Wharf railway line
South Gippsland:
Strzelecki railway line
Wonthaggi railway line
Outtrim railway line
Barry Beach railway line
Welshpool Jetty railway line
Woodside railway line
South Gippsland railway line (South Gippsland Railway)

Closed stations

On operational lines

South West

West

North

North East

East

On closed lines

See also
List of regional railway stations in Victoria
List of closed Melbourne railway stations

References

External links
Vicsig.net – statewide line guides
Timeline featuring opening and closure dates of lines
Victorian Railway Maps 1860 – 2000

Railway stations in Victoria, closed regional
Vic
Railway stations, closed